Charlie Polite is an American boxer, born in Holyoke, Massachusetts. He is 6 feet 3 inches tall.

Life

Born in Garnet, SC, raised in Springfield, MA, he was described as an "odd American journeyman."

Boxing career 
Charlie Polite started off his career by defeating Abe Davis, Benny Spinola, and Kid (John) Crockett. However, his next 3 fights ended in losses. He later fought Joe Frazier, but lost by 2nd round KO. He fought in 49 more fights, and compiled a record of 17 wins (6 by KO), 39 losses, and 3 draws. By the time he fought George Foreman in an exhibition bout, he had lost 30 of 46 professional fights; in that fight, he went all of the scheduled three rounds, and kissed Foreman on the chin while the referee read the instructions.

He also fought Dave Zyglewicz,  Floyd Patterson, Earnie Shavers, Chuck Wepner, and Gerry Cooney.

Exhibition boxing record

References

Boxers from Massachusetts
Heavyweight boxers
Year of birth missing (living people)
Living people
American male boxers
Sportspeople from Holyoke, Massachusetts